Birmingham Botanical Gardens may refer to:
 Birmingham Botanical Gardens, England - a 15-hectare botanical garden in Birmingham, England
 Birmingham Botanical Gardens, Alabama - a 27.3 hectare botanical garden in Birmingham, Alabama